The Musketeers of the Guard or King's Musketeers had the full name - Musketeers of the military household of the King of France. They were an elite fighting company of the military branch of the Maison du Roi, the Royal Household of the French monarchy.

History

They were founded in 1622 when Louis XIII furnished a company of light cavalry (the carabins, created by Louis' father Henry IV) with muskets.  The Musketeers fought in battles both on foot (infantry) and on horseback (cavalry).  They formed the royal guard for the king while he was outside of the royal residences (within the royal residences, the king's guard was the Garde du corps and the Gardes suisses). The Musketeers of the Guard wore an early type of military uniform with a tabard (known as soubreveste), indicating that they "belonged" to the King, and an embroidered white cross denoting the fact that they were formed during the Huguenot rebellions in support of the Catholic cause.

Shortly after the Musketeers were established, a second company was founded to report to Cardinal Richelieu.  At the cardinal's death in 1642, the company passed to his successor Cardinal Mazarin, who disbanded his Musketeers in 1646. He revived the Musketeers in 1657 with a company of 150 men.  Upon Mazarin's death in 1661, the cardinal's Musketeers passed to Louis XIV.

In 1664, the two companies were reorganized: one company took the name "Grey Musketeers" (mousquetaires gris) from the color of their matched horses, while the second were called "Black Musketeers" (mousquetaires noirs), mounted on black horses.  At roughly the same time, the size of the Musketeer companies was doubled.

The Musketeers were among the most prestigious of the military companies of the Ancien Régime, and in principle membership in the companies was reserved for nobles.  With the reforms of Michel le Tellier – which mandated a certain number of years of military service before nobles could attain the rank of officer – many nobles sought to do this service in the privileged Musketeer companies.

In 1776, the Musketeers were disbanded by Louis XVI for budgetary reasons. Reformed in 1789, they were disbanded again shortly after the French Revolution. They were reformed on 6 July 1814 and definitively disbanded on 1 January 1816.

Notable Musketeers of the Guard
The following are some of the notable Musketeers:
Charles de Batz de Castelmore d'Artagnan (The historical basis of Alexander Dumas' character d'Artagnan in his 1844 novel The Three Musketeers)
Henri d'Aramitz (The historical basis of Dumas' character Aramis in The Three Musketeers)
Armand d'Athos (The historical basis of Dumas' character Athos in The Three Musketeers)
Isaac de Porthau (The historical basis of Dumas' character Porthos in The Three Musketeers)
Jean-Armand du Peyrer de Troisville (The historical basis of Dumas' character Monsieur de Tréville in The Three Musketeers)
Gilbert du Motier, Marquis de Lafayette (later American Revolutionary War general)
Louis de Rouvroy, duc de Saint-Simon
Étienne de Boré, first Mayor of New Orleans

Gallery

In pop culture 

 The Three Musketeers
 The Three Musketeers (2011 film)

References

This article is based in part on the article Mousquetaire from the French Wikipedia, retrieved on September 9, 2006.''

Further reading

 

 
1622 establishments in France
1816 disestablishments in France
Guards regiments of France
Military units and formations established in 1622
Military units and formations established in 1657
Military units and formations established in 1789
Military units and formations established in 1814
Military units and formations disestablished in 1775
Military units and formations disestablished in the 1640s
Military units and formations disestablished in 1792
Military units and formations disestablished in 1816
Guard regiments of the Ancien Régime
Louis XIII